"House of 1000 Corpses" is the final track on Rob Zombie's second solo album The Sinister Urge. The song was used in the 2003 horror movie of the same name, which was written and directed by Zombie.

Review
The song features audio clips from Ilsa, She Wolf of the SS. Although the song runs for 9:26 on the album, the song itself only runs for 6:26. There is about a minute of static noise and then a hidden song titled "Unholy Three" (starts at 7:45) which occupies the remainder of the track. This is the second time Zombie has made extended pieces of music, the first being the 11-minute "Blood, Milk and Sky", released under Zombie's previous band, White Zombie.

Release
The song also makes an appearance on Zombie's greatest hits album The Best of Rob Zombie.

Production
In addition, it is used over the opening credits to the horror movie of the same name, which was written and directed by Zombie.

Credits
 Tom Baker - Mastering
 Scott Humphrey - Producer, Programming, Mixing
 Blasko - Bass
 Riggs - Guitar
 Tempesta - Drums
 Rob Zombie - Vocals, Lyricist, Producer, Art Direction

Covers
The song was covered by Skoink for The Electro-Industrial Tribute to Rob Zombie in 2002. It was also covered by Zombie Girl in 2007 on their Blood, Brains & Rock 'n' Roll album.

References

Rob Zombie songs
2001 songs
Songs written by Rob Zombie
Songs written by Scott Humphrey
Firefly (film series)